Justice Easley may refer to:

Charles Easley, associate justice of the Mississippi Supreme Court
Mack Easley, associate justice of the New Mexico Supreme Court